NEDD8-conjugating enzyme Ubc12 is a protein that in humans is encoded by the UBE2M gene.

The modification of proteins with ubiquitin is an important cellular mechanism for targeting abnormal or short-lived proteins for degradation. Ubiquitination involves at least three classes of enzymes: ubiquitin-activating enzymes, or E1s, ubiquitin-conjugating enzymes, or E2s, and ubiquitin-protein ligases, or E3s. This gene encodes a member of the E2 ubiquitin-conjugating enzyme family. The encoded protein is linked with a ubiquitin-like protein, NEDD8, which can be conjugated to cellular proteins, such as Cdc53/culin.

Interactions
UBE2M has been shown to interact with NEDD8,  PRKAR1A and UBA3.

References

Further reading